Alice J. Shaw was an American musical performer, who was billed as "The Whistling Prima Donna" and, in French, "La Belle Siffleuse."

Early life
Alice Horton was born in Elmira, New York, the daughter of William Horton, a stock broker.

Career
Alice J. Shaw toured Europe and India performing as a whistler, starting in 1886 with a performance for teachers at Steinway Hall in New York City. In England the following year, she whistled for the Prince of Wales.  

Because a "whistling woman" was sometimes considered vulgar or unwise,  Shaw was careful to craft her shows with the utmost decorum, both in her physical movements and in her facial expressions. Reviewers remarked on her ability to follow sheet music, which emphasized her self-discipline. An anonymous New York Times reviewer, however, commented that "her notions of melody are weird and uncanny ... and reminds one of little children, in that she ought to be seen but not heard. However, she seems determined to make a noise ..." Another reviewer that year acknowledged her uniqueness, and hoped she would remain so, because "a generation of whistlers is an appalling thing to imagine."

Later in life, she performed with two of her daughters, Ethel and Elsie, whistling and singing twins known as "the May Blossoms." Shaw also made some of the earliest recordings of whistling. In 1888, while touring England, she made wax cylinders with Edison's representative, George Edward Gouraud. She later made commercial recordings, some of which have survived. She was also one of the earliest celebrity spokeswomen for a weight loss product, in 1897 ads for "Dr. Edison Obesity Pills and Obesity Fruit Salts".

Personal life
Alice Horton married William Holland Shaw. They had four daughters before they divorced in 1888. There was a rumor that she divorced to marry "Buffalo Bill", William Cody. She testified that she had no material assets and lived with her aunt in 1903. She hoped to marry again, to David L. Howell, but he died in 1907 before their wedding.

References

Sample from 1907

A 1907 recording of Alice Shaw and her twin daughters performing a whistling trio, "Spring-tide Revels"

Vaudeville performers
Whistlers
19th-century American women